Dhaykhindi is a village in the Karmala taluka of Solapur district in Maharashtra state, India.

Demographics
Covering  and comprising 167 households at the time of the 2011 census of India, Dhaykhindi had a population of 958. There were 487 males and 471 females, with 144 people being aged six or younger.

References

Villages in Karmala taluka